São Gonçalo do Amarante may refer to:

Gonçalo de Amarante, Portuguese priest and hermit
São Gonçalo do Amarante, Rio Grande do Norte, a municipality in Brazil
São Gonçalo do Amarante, Ceará, a municipality in Brazil